Amaryllis is a small genus of flowering bulbs, with two species.

Amaryllis may also refer to:

People
 Amaryllis Fleming (1925–1999), British cello performer and teacher
 Amaryllis Garnett (1943–1973), English actress
 Amaryllis (Ryllis) Llewellyn Hacon, pseudonym of Edith Hacon, later Mrs Robichaud (1875–1952), British suffragist, WWI nursing hospital volunteer and socialite
 Amaryllis Knight, co-owner and operator of Falcon Motorcycles
 Amaryllis Tremblay, Canadian actress
 Amaryllis, a character in Vergil's Eclogues
 Amaryllis, a character in Meredith Willson's The Music Man

In biology
 The amaryllis family, a monocot plant family formally known as Amaryllidaceae
 Amaryllis berteroi, also known as Zephyranthes robusta
 Schinia amaryllis, a moth of the family Noctuidae
 Hippeastrum, a genus of South American bulbs whose cultivars are commonly sold as "amaryllis"
 Amaryllis (crustacean), a genus of amphipods

Music
 Amaryllis Chamber Ensemble, in Boston
 Amaryllis (Marilyn Crispell, Gary Peacock and Paul Motian album), 2000
 Amaryllis (Shinedown album), a 2012 album by Shinedown and its title track
 "Amaryllis" (song), a 1988 by the Japanese band Wink
 "Amaryllis", a 1581 gavotte from the Ballet Comique de la Reine by Balthasar de Beaujoyeulx
 "Amaryllis", a 17th-century air de cour composed by Louis XIII of France; see Ballet Comique de la Reine

Other uses
 Amaryllis (catamaran), a catamaran sailboat by Nathanael Greene Herreshoff launched in 1876
 Amaryllis (given name)
 Amaryllis (restaurant), in Glasgow, Scotland
 Amaryllis (ship), which wrecked on the coast of Palm Beach County, Florida in 1965
 Amaryllis (yacht), built in 2011 by Abeking & Rasmussen
 1085 Amaryllis, a minor planet orbiting the Sun
 "Amaryllis", an award-nominated short story by Carrie Vaughn
 "Opp Amaryllis!", a 1791 song by Carl Michael Bellman

See also
 Amarillo (disambiguation)
 Amarilis (disambiguation)